National Organization for Development of Exceptional Talents (NODET;  Sāzmān-e Melli-ye Parvareŝ-e Este'dādhā-ye Deraxŝān, or  SAMPAD) is an Iranian organization that recruits students for middle and high schools through a two-step set of exams at each level. The organization is aimed to provide a unique educational environment for the exceptionally talented students.

History
The organization was founded in 1976 as the National Iranian Organization for Gifted and Talented Education (NIOGATE). The original faculty were trained by a visiting group of educators from the United States.
After the revolution, the schools were shut down for a few years but were later re-opened. In 1988, the organization was renamed to National Organization for Development of Exceptional Talents. From 1988 to 2009, Javad Ezhe'i was the manager of NODET, who was succeeded by Dr. Etemadi and Dr. Ghaffari and Mohajerani. Re-construction of NODET initiated with Elham Yavari.

Structure
The schools, like other Iranian schools, are gendered. Girls' schools are generally called Farzanegan School, whereas boys' schools have different names in different cities. Most of these schools are named after Iranian benefactors, scientists or martyrs.

Honours and alumni
NODET students are reputed to be successful in various exams and competitions such as Konkour (Iranian National Universities Entrance Exam), scientific and literature olympiads, Khawrazmi International Award, and RoboCup Competitions. NODET students have won more than 250 medals in the International Science Olympiads. Among the alumni of NODET are many successful academics and individuals. One well-known example was Prof. Maryam Mirzakhani, a professor of mathematics at Stanford University, who was the first woman and the first Iranian honored with the Fields Medal (the most prestigious award in mathematics). A large fraction of the NODET graduates is admitted to foreign universities in the US, Canada, Australia, and the EU.

Admission to schools
Admission to NODET schools was selective and based on an annual comprehensive nationwide entrance examination procedure for students in grade 6 (elementary school) and grade 9 (middle school). A minimum GPA of 19 (out of 20) was required for attending the entrance exam. There is however a nationwide exam to fill in the seats in high schools at the end of Year 9. The entrance exam at each level includes a number of 4 choice and written questions which test the applicants' intelligence and maths and science skills based on what they have studied in previous years. The sources of questions were not revealed. Statistically, less than 1% of applicants were chosen to enter the 99 middle schools and 98 high schools across the country. In 2006 87,081 boys and 83,596 girls from 56 cities applied. 6,888 students were accepted for the 2007 middle schools. In 2019, over 174,000 candidates have applied for NODET schools in 7th grade (junior high school), and 17,223 were admitted. In the same year, over 132,000 candidates applied for seats in 10th grade (senior high schools), and only 11,867 were offered a place.

The style of questions varied greatly each year. Some questions would describe a particular phenomenon and its related problems. Then, students were asked to provided solutions and reasoning. The evaluation of the answers wouldn't be based on the choice, but on the described reason, trying to distinguish students with higher reasoning abilities. In another atypical type of question, students were introduced with a brief introduction on a certain complex scientific topic, which most students were not supposedly familiar with. Afterward, students were asked to solve a given problem using mathematical calculations, reasoning, or even their common sense.

Statistics show that NODET alumni usually pursue higher education up to the post-graduate level.

Famous NODET High schools 
Girls' schools are generally called Farzanegan School, whereas boys' schools have different names in different cities. Some of the famous schools are Allameh Helli in Tehran  and Kerman. Later new branches were established with various names, such as Bahonar in Karaj, Beheshti High Schools in Khorramabad, Sari, Torbat Heydariyeh, Zahedan, Ardabil, Semnan, Shahrud, Sabzevar, Zanjan, Ahwaz, Kashan, Kermanshah, Tonekabon, Sanandaj, Ilam, Shahrekord,  Amol, Ghaemshahr, Yasuj, Birjand, Bojnurd, Babol, Gorgan, Borujerd, Maragheh, Hamedan, Arak, Shahid Babaei Highschool in Qazvin, Shahid Ghuddusi Highschool in Qom, Madani, Ostad Shahriar (OSH) in Tabriz, Mianeh, Allameh Jafari School in Marand, Shahid Soltani School, Darolfonoun in Shahriar, Haghani in Bandar Abbass, Hashemi Nejad School in Mashhad, Sheikh Ansari High School in Dezful, Dastgheib High school in Shiraz, Shabzendedar High school in Jahrom, Shahid Ejei High School in Isfahan, Mirzakouchakkhan in Rasht, and Sadoughi in Yazd.

See also 
Education in Iran
Gifted education
Selective schools
Maryam Mirzakhani

References

External links
 National Organization for Development of Exceptional Talents

 
Selective schools
Gifted education
Educational organisations based in Iran